The Wild White Man of Badu is a 1950 novel by Ion Idriess. It is about two convicts who escape from Norfolk Island and travel to Badu Island on the Torres Strait.

It is connected to Idriess' novel Isles of Despair.

References

External links
The Wild White Man of Badu at AustLit

1950 Australian novels
Novels set on islands
Torres Strait Islands culture
Novels by Ion Idriess
Angus & Robertson books